Felipe Mateus Scheibig (born 8 March 2000), known as Felipe Scheibig, is a Brazilian professional footballer who plays as a goalkeeper for Grêmio.

Career

He started his career with Grêmio.

Honours
Grêmio
Campeonato Gaúcho: 2022
Recopa Gaúcha: 2022, 2023

References

External links
 at the Grêmio FBPA website

2000 births
Living people
Brazilian footballers
Association football goalkeepers
Grêmio Foot-Ball Porto Alegrense players
Campeonato Brasileiro Série A players